Wootton is an English place name meaning place by the wood. The standard pronunciation rhymes the first syllable with foot.

Places
Places in England called Wootton
Wootton, Bedfordshire
Wootton Fitzpaine, Dorset
Wootton, New Forest, hamlet in south-west Hampshire
Wootton St Lawrence, village near Basingstoke, Hampshire
Wootton, Almeley, a location in Herefordshire
Wootton, Dormington, a location in Herefordshire
Wootton, Isle of Wight
Wootton Bridge
Wootton, Kent
Wootton, Lincolnshire
Wootton, Northamptonshire
Wootton, Vale of White Horse, Oxfordshire
Wootton, West Oxfordshire, Oxfordshire (also known as Wootton-by-Woodstock)
Wootton, Onibury, a location in Shropshire
Wootton, Oswestry Rural, a location in Shropshire
Wootton, Staffordshire, East Staffordshire
Wootton, Stafford, a location in Staffordshire

Wootton Wawen, village in Stratford, England
Royal Wootton Bassett, town in Wiltshire
Wootton Rivers, Wiltshire
Leek Wootton, Warwickshire
Woottons, a location in Staffordshire

Places in Australia called Wootton
Wootton, New South Wales

Fictional places called Wootton
Wootton Major, a fictional place in the short story Smith of Wootton Major by J. R. R. Tolkien

People
Wootton is also a surname derived from the place name.

Barbara Adam Wootton, economist
Bob Wootton, folk guitarist with Johnny Cash
Brenda Wootton, Cornish folk singer
Chris Wootton, Australian Race Driver
Corey Wootton, American football player
David Wootton, British lawyer and politician
Curt Wootton, American actor
Frank Wootton, English painter
Frank Wootton, Australian jockey
George Wootton (1834-1924), English cricketer
Jeff Wootton, English musician
John Wootton, English painter
Lloyd "Moon" Wootton, Canadian lacrosse player
Marc Wootton (born 1975), English comedian
Richens Lacey Wootton
Scott Wootton, English footballer
Thomas Sprigg Wootton, founder of Montgomery County, Maryland

See also
Wootten
Wooten
North Wootton (disambiguation)
Wotton (disambiguation)
Thomas S. Wootton High School